The Vickers Virginia was a biplane heavy bomber of the British Royal Air Force, developed from the Vickers Vimy.

Design and development
Work on the Virginia was started in 1920, as a replacement for the Vimy. Two prototypes were ordered on 13 January 1921 and another two prototypes were ordered in September 1922. The Virginia was similar to the Vimy but notably had a lowered front gunner's pulpit to allow the pilot a greater field of view, 20 ft (6 m) greater wingspan and a 9 ft (3 m) longer fuselage. The aircraft was powered by twin Napier Lion engines and flew for the first time on 24 November 1922.

At the Aircraft Experimental Establishment at RAF Martlesham Heath, the Virginia prototype underwent type trials. One of the first modifications was to replace the original two-bladed propellers with four-bladed propellers. An unusual set of "fighting top" turrets were added to the top wings, but these were later deleted from production aircraft. Marks I–VI had straight wings and the Mark VII introduced swept outer wings. Starting with the Mark III the Virginia mounted a rear fuselage gunner, who was moved into a tail turret in the Mark VII. The Mark X was introduced in late 1924 and featured a duralumin and steel structure covered in fabric, aluminium, and wood. A total of 124 Virginias were built, of which 50 were Mark Xs.

Operational history
The first squadron of Virginia Mark Is was formed in 1924. Despite mediocre performance, the aircraft served frontline units until 1938, when it was replaced by the newer Wellingtons, Hampdens and Whitleys. Designs such as the Fairey Hendon and Handley Page Heyford supplemented rather than replaced the Virginia.

The final almost all-metal Virginia Mark X was the most numerous RAF bomber until the Heyford in 1934. After its technical obsolescence as a bomber it was used for photography and for parachute training, with jump platforms installed behind the engine nacelles. On 26 June 1940, a committee discussing the need for airborne cannon for use against invading tanks suggested equipping Virginias with the equally antiquated COW 37 mm gun (1.46 in Coventry Ordnance Works gun). This was not acted on.

In the 1930s, the Virginias were used in some of the first tests of inflight refueling, although they were never used outside of tests. The Virginia was developed in parallel with the Vickers Victoria freighter and the two aircraft had much in common, sharing the same wing design. The Virginias were highly accident prone, with 81 losses. Despite their obsolescence, Virginias continued to soldier on in support roles with the Parachute Test Flight at Henlow until December 1941.

Variants
 Type 57 Virginia Mk I
 Initial prototype for the RAF, powered by two 450 hp (340 kW) Napier Lion piston engines. One prototype only.
 Type 96 Virginia Mk I
 The first type 57 Virginia prototype was re-engined with two 650 hp (490 kW) Rolls-Royce Condor piston engines. One prototype only.
 Type 115 Virginia Mk VIII
 The Type 96 Virginia prototype was fitted with a lengthened fuselage, new forward fuselage and gun positions. One prototype only.
 Type 129 Virginia Mk VII
 The Type 115 Virginia was converted into the Virginia VII prototype. One prototype only.
 Type 76 Virginia Mk II
 Second Virginia prototype, powered by two Napier lion piston engines, fitted with lengthened nose. One built.
 Type 79 Virginia Mk III
 Twin-engined heavy night bomber biplane for the RAF, powered by two 468 hp (349 kW) Napier Lion II piston engines, equipped with dual controls. Six built.
 Type 99 Virginia Mk IV
 Twin-engined heavy night-bomber biplane. Similar to the Virginia Mk II, but with additional equipment.
 Type 100 Virginia Mk V
 Twin-engined heavy night-bomber biplane, equipped with a third (central) rudder in the tail unit. 22 built.
 Type 108 Virginia Mk VI
 Twin-engined heavy night-bomber biplane. Introduced revisions in wing folding and rigging. 25 built.
 Type 112 Virginia Mk VII
 Twin-engined heavy night-bomber biplane. Redesigned nose, lengthened rear fuselage and sweepback wings. 11 built and 38 conversions.
 Type 128 Virginia Mk IX
 Twin-engined heavy night-bomber biplane.  Introduced automatic slats, wheel breaks and a tail gunner's position. Eight built and 27 conversions.
 Type 139 Virginia Mk X
 Twin-engined heavy night-bomber biplane. Incorporated an all-metal structure. 50 built and 53 conversions.

Operators

 Royal Air Force
 No. 7 Squadron RAF – May 1924 to March 1936 (RAF Bircham Newton, RAF Worthy Down)
 No. 9 Squadron RAF – April 1924 to May 1936 (RAF Boscombe Down, RAF Andover, RAF Aldergrove)
 No. 10 Squadron RAF – September 1932 to January 1935 (RAF Boscombe Down)
 No. 51 Squadron RAF – March 1937 to February 1938 (RAF Driffield, RAF Boscombe Down)
 No. 58 Squadron RAF – December 1924 to January 1938 (RAF Worthy Down, RAF Upper Heyford, RAF Driffield, RAF Boscombe Down)
 No. 75 Squadron RAF – March to September 1937 (RAF Driffield)
 No. 214 Squadron RAF – September 1935 to April 1937 (RAF Boscombe Down, RAF Andover, RAF Scampton)
 No. 215 Squadron RAF- October 1935 to September 1937 (RAF Worthy Down, RAF Upper Heyford, RAF Driffield)
 No. 500 Squadron RAF – March 1931 to January 1936 (RAF Manston)
 No. 502 Squadron RAF – December 1931 to October 1935 (RAF Aldergrove)
 Night Flying Flight (RAF Biggin Hill)
 Parachute Test Flight (RAF Henlow)
 Research Development Flight (RAF Farnborough, RAF Exeter)

Video
 Film of Vickers Virginia flight operations
 Film of an experimental catapult launch of a Vickers Virginia

Specifications (Virginia X)

See also

References
Notes

Bibliography

 Andrews, C.F. and E.B. Morgan. Vickers Aircraft since 1908. London: Putnam, 1989. .
 Jarrett, Philip. "By Day and by Night:Vickers Virginia". Aeroplane Monthly, May 1993, Vol 21 No 5, Issue No 241. . pp. 24–29, 45.
 Mason, Francis K. The British Bomber since 1914. London: Putnam, 1994. .
 Morgan, Eric. "Big Bombers from Brooklands: The RAF's Virginia Family." Air Enthusiast, Thirty-one, July–November 1986, pp. 34–42, 7179.  Bromley, UK: Fine Scroll. .
 Sturivant, Ray. "Vickers Virginia X J6856." Aviation News, Vol. 13, No. 22, 22 March–4 April 1985.
 Thetford, Owen. "By Day and by Night: Ginnies in Service", Part 1. Aeroplane Monthly, June 1993, Vol. 21, No. 6, Issue No. 242, pp. 32–39. .
 Thetford, Owen. "By Day and by Night: Ginnies in Service", Part 2. Aeroplane Monthly, July 1993, Vol. 22, No. 1, Issue No. 243, pp. 18–23.. .
 Winchester, Jim. Bombers of the 20th Century. London: Airlife Publishing Ltd., 2003. .

External links

1920s British bomber aircraft
Virginia
Aircraft first flown in 1922
Biplanes
Twin piston-engined tractor aircraft